In philately the word imprimatur refers to the first stamps printed from an approved and finished printing plate.

The term is particularly associated with British Victorian stamps as it was the practice of the printers to retain the first sheet as a record.

The word is from the Latin "let it be printed".

References 

Philatelic terminology